The annus mirabilis papers (from Latin annus mīrābilis, "miracle year") are the four papers that Albert Einstein published in Annalen der Physik (Annals of Physics), a scientific journal, in 1905. These four papers were major contributions to the foundation of modern physics. They revolutionized science's understanding of the fundamental concepts of space, time, mass, and energy. Because Einstein published these remarkable papers in a single year, 1905 is called his annus mirabilis (miracle year in English or Wunderjahr in German).

 The first paper explained the photoelectric effect, which established the energy of the light quanta , and was the only specific discovery mentioned in the citation awarding Einstein the Nobel Prize in Physics.  
 The second paper explained Brownian motion, which established the Einstein relation  and led reluctant physicists to accept the existence of atoms. 
 The third paper introduced Einstein's theory of special relativity, which established the universal constant speed of light  for all reference frames and a theory of spacetime. 
 The fourth, a consequence of the theory of special relativity, developed the principle of mass-energy equivalence, expressed in the famous equation  and which led to the discovery and use of atomic energy.
These four papers, together with quantum mechanics and Einstein's later theory of general relativity, are the foundation of modern physics.

Background

At the time the papers were written, Einstein did not have easy access to a complete set of scientific reference materials, although he did regularly read and contribute reviews to Annalen der Physik. Additionally, scientific colleagues available to discuss his theories were few. He worked as an examiner at the Patent Office in Bern, Switzerland, and he later said of a co-worker there, Michele Besso, that he "could not have found a better sounding board for my ideas in all of Europe". In addition, co-workers and the other members of the self-styled "Olympia Academy" (Maurice Solovine and Conrad Habicht) and his wife, Mileva Marić, had some influence on Einstein's work, but how much is unclear.
 
Through these papers, Einstein tackled some of the era's most important physics questions and problems. In 1900, Lord Kelvin, in a lecture titled "Nineteenth-Century Clouds over the Dynamical Theory of Heat and Light", suggested that physics had no satisfactory explanations for the results of the Michelson–Morley experiment and for black body radiation. As introduced, special relativity provided an account for the results of the Michelson–Morley experiments. Einstein's explanation of the photoelectric effect extended the quantum theory which Max Planck had developed in his successful explanation of black-body radiation.

Despite the greater fame achieved by his other works, such as that on special relativity, it was his work on the photoelectric effect that won him his Nobel Prize in 1921. The Nobel committee had waited patiently for experimental confirmation of special relativity; however, none was forthcoming until the time dilation experiments of Ives and Stilwell (1938 and 1941) and Rossi and Hall (1941).

Papers

Photoelectric effect

The article "Über einen die Erzeugung und Verwandlung des Lichtes betreffenden heuristischen Gesichtspunkt" ("On a Heuristic Viewpoint Concerning the Production and Transformation of Light") received March 18 and published June 9, proposed the idea of energy quanta. This idea, motivated by Max Planck's earlier derivation of the law of black-body radiation (which was preceded by the discovery of Wien's displacement law, by Wilhelm Wien, several years prior to Planck) assumes that luminous energy can be absorbed or emitted only in discrete amounts, called quanta. Einstein states,

In explaining the photoelectric effect, the hypothesis that energy consists of discrete packets, as Einstein illustrates, can be directly applied to black bodies, as well.

The idea of light quanta contradicts the wave theory of light that follows naturally from James Clerk Maxwell's equations for electromagnetic behavior and, more generally, the assumption of infinite divisibility of energy in physical systems.

Einstein noted that the photoelectric effect depended on the wavelength, and hence the frequency of the light.  At too low a frequency, even intense light produced no electrons.  However, once a certain frequency was reached, even low intensity light produced electrons.  He compared this to Planck's hypothesis that light could be emitted only in packets of energy given by hf, where h is Planck's constant and f is the frequency.  He then postulated that light travels in packets whose energy depends on the frequency, and therefore only light above a certain frequency would bring sufficient energy to liberate an electron.

Even after experiments confirmed that Einstein's equations for the photoelectric effect were accurate, his explanation was not universally accepted. Niels Bohr, in his 1922 Nobel address, stated, "The hypothesis of light-quanta is not able to throw light on the nature of radiation."

By 1921, when Einstein was awarded the Nobel Prize and his work on photoelectricity was mentioned by name in the award citation, some physicists accepted that the equation  was correct and light quanta were possible. In 1923, Arthur Compton's X-ray scattering experiment helped more of the scientific community to accept this formula. The theory of light quanta was a strong indicator of wave–particle duality, a fundamental principle of quantum mechanics. A complete picture of the theory of photoelectricity was realized after the maturity of quantum mechanics.

Brownian motion

The article "Über die von der molekularkinetischen Theorie der Wärme geforderte Bewegung von in ruhenden Flüssigkeiten suspendierten Teilchen" ("On the Motion of Small Particles Suspended in a Stationary Liquid, as Required by the Molecular Kinetic Theory of Heat"), received May 11 and published July 18, delineated a stochastic model of Brownian motion.

Einstein derived expressions for the mean squared displacement of particles. Using the kinetic theory of gases, which at the time was controversial, the article established that the phenomenon, which had lacked a satisfactory explanation even decades after it was first observed, provided empirical evidence for the reality of the atom. It also lent credence to statistical mechanics, which had been controversial at that time, as well. Before this paper, atoms were recognized as a useful concept, but physicists and chemists debated whether atoms were real entities. Einstein's statistical discussion of atomic behavior gave experimentalists a way to count atoms by looking through an ordinary microscope. Wilhelm Ostwald, one of the leaders of the anti-atom school, later told Arnold Sommerfeld that he had been convinced of the existence of atoms by  Jean Perrin's subsequent Brownian motion experiments.

Special relativity

 
Einstein's "Zur Elektrodynamik bewegter Körper" ("On the Electrodynamics of Moving Bodies"), his third paper that year, was received on June 30 and published September 26. It reconciles Maxwell's equations for electricity and magnetism with the laws of mechanics by introducing major changes to mechanics close to the speed of light. This later became known as Einstein's special theory of relativity.

The paper mentions the names of only five other scientists: Isaac Newton, James Clerk Maxwell, Heinrich Hertz, Christian Doppler, and Hendrik Lorentz. It does not have any references to any other publications. Many of the ideas had already been published by others, as detailed in history of special relativity and relativity priority dispute. However, Einstein's paper introduces a theory of time, distance, mass, and energy that was consistent with electromagnetism, but omitted the force of gravity.

At the time, it was known that Maxwell's equations, when applied to moving bodies, led to asymmetries (moving magnet and conductor problem), and that it had not been possible to discover any motion of the Earth relative to the 'light medium' (i.e. aether). Einstein puts forward two postulates to explain these observations. First, he applies the principle of relativity, which states that the laws of physics remain the same for any non-accelerating frame of reference (called an inertial reference frame), to the laws of electrodynamics and optics as well as mechanics. In the second postulate, Einstein proposes that the speed of light has the same value in all frames of reference, independent of the state of motion of the emitting body.

Special relativity is thus consistent with the result of the Michelson–Morley experiment, which had not detected a medium of conductance (or aether) for light waves unlike other known waves that require a medium (such as water or air). Einstein may not have known about that experiment, but states,

The speed of light is fixed, and thus not relative to the movement of the observer. This was impossible under Newtonian classical mechanics. Einstein argues,

It had previously been proposed, by George FitzGerald in 1889 and by Lorentz in 1892, independently of each other, that the Michelson–Morley result could be accounted for if moving bodies were contracted in the direction of their motion. Some of the paper's core equations, the Lorentz transforms, had been published by Joseph Larmor (1897, 1900), Hendrik Lorentz (1895, 1899, 1904) and Henri Poincaré (1905), in a development of Lorentz's 1904 paper. Einstein's presentation differed from the explanations given by FitzGerald, Larmor, and Lorentz, but was similar in many respects to the formulation by Poincaré (1905).

His explanation arises from two axioms. The first is Galileo's idea that the laws of nature should be the same for all observers that move with constant speed relative to each other. Einstein writes,

The second axiom is the rule that the speed of light is the same for every observer.

The theory, now called the special theory of relativity, distinguishes it from his later general theory of relativity, which considers all observers to be equivalent. Special relativity gained widespread acceptance remarkably quickly, confirming Einstein's comment that it had been "ripe for discovery" in 1905. Acknowledging the role of Max Planck in the early dissemination of his ideas, Einstein wrote in 1913 "The attention that this theory so quickly received from colleagues is surely to be ascribed in large part to the resoluteness and warmth with which he [Planck] intervened for this theory". In addition, the improved mathematical formulation of the theory by Hermann Minkowski in 1907 was influential in gaining acceptance for the theory. Also, and most importantly, the theory was supported by an ever-increasing body of confirmatory experimental evidence.

Mass–energy equivalence

On November 21 Annalen der Physik published a fourth paper (received September 27) "Ist die Trägheit eines Körpers von seinem Energieinhalt abhängig?" ("Does the Inertia of a Body Depend Upon Its Energy Content?"), in which Einstein deduced what is arguably the most famous of all equations: .

Einstein considered the equivalency equation to be of paramount importance because it showed that a massive particle possesses an energy, the "rest energy", distinct from its classical kinetic and potential energies. The paper is based on James Clerk Maxwell's and Heinrich Rudolf Hertz's investigations and, in addition, the axioms of relativity, as Einstein states,

The result shows how much energy will be released or consumed, usually in the form of light or heat. When applied to certain nuclear reactions, the equation shows that an extraordinarily large amount of energy will be released, millions of times as much as in the combustion of chemical explosives, where the amount of mass converted to energy is negligible. This explains why nuclear weapons and nuclear reactors produce such phenomenal amounts of energy, as they release binding energy during nuclear fission and nuclear fusion, and convert a portion of subatomic mass to energy.

Commemoration
The International Union of Pure and Applied Physics (IUPAP) resolved to commemorate the 100th year of the publication of Einstein's extensive work in 1905 as the World Year of Physics 2005. This was subsequently endorsed by the United Nations.

References

Citations

Primary sources

Secondary sources
 Gribbin, John, and Gribbin, Mary. Annus Mirabilis: 1905, Albert Einstein, and the Theory of Relativity, Chamberlain Bros., 2005. . (Includes DVD.)
 Renn, Jürgen, and Dieter Hoffmann, "1905—a miraculous year". 2005 J. Phys. B: At. Mol. Opt. Phys. 38 S437-S448 (Max Planck Institute for the History of Science) [Issue 9 (14 May 2005)]. .
 Stachel, John, et al., Einstein's Miraculous Year. Princeton University Press, 1998. .

External links
 Collection of the Annus Mirabilis papers and their English translations

1905 documents
1905 in science
Historical physics publications
Old quantum theory
Physics papers
Works by Albert Einstein
Works originally published in Annalen der Physik